Mar Timothy II (also Timotheos II) was Patriarch of the Church of the East from 1318 to  1332.  He became leader of the church at a time of profound external stress due to loss of favor with the Mongol rulers of Persia.

Eleven bishops were present at Timothy's consecration in 1318: the metropolitans Joseph of Ilam, Abdisho of Nisibis and Shemon of Mosul, and the bishops Shemon of Beth Garmaï, Shemon of Tirhan, Shemon of Balad, Yohannan of Beth Waziq, Yohannan of Shigar, Abdisho of Hnitha, Isaac of Beth Daron and Ishoyahb of Tella and Barbelli (Marga).  Timothy himself had been metropolitan of Erbil before his election as patriarch.

One of Timothy's first acts as patriarch was to call a synod in February 1318 and to affirm the Nomocanon of Abdisho of Nisibis as a source of ecclesiastical law.  The canons of this synod were the last to have been recorded in the Church of the East before the nineteenth century.

Timothy wrote an important treatise on the sacraments of the Church, part of which has been translated into English.

See also
List of patriarchs of the Church of the East

Notes

References
Angelo Mai, Scriptorum Veterum Nova Collectio e Vaticanis Codicibus Edita, volume 10 (Rome:  Typis Collegii Urbanii, 1838), Syriac text on pp. 260–268; Latin translation on pp. 96–105.  The 13 canons of the synod of Timothy II.
Paul Blaize Kadicheeni, The mystery of baptism : the text and translation of the chapter "On Holy baptism" from the causes of the seven mysteries of the Church of Timothy II, Nestorian patriarch (1318–1332) (Bangalore:  Dharmaram Publications, 1980).  English translation of one part of Timothy's treatise on the sacraments.
Wilhelm Baum and Dietmar W. Winkler, The Church of the East: a concise history (London & New York: Taylor & Francis, 2003) [English language edition]
William Toma, The Mystery of the Church. Syriac Critical Edition and Translation of the Rite of the Consecration of the Altar with Oil and the Chapter ‘On the Consecration of the Church’ from the Book of the Seven Causes of the Mysteries of the Church by Patriarch Timothy II (1318–1332) (Diss. Rome: PIO [Pontifical Oriental Institute], 2007).  Another part of Timothy's treatise on the sacraments.

Patriarchs of the Church of the East
14th-century bishops of the Church of the East